Ernest Fernand Lévecque (2 September 1852 – 4 July 1947) was a colonial administrator of a number of possessions of the French Colonial Empire. He was born in Beaurieux, Aisne département, France.

Titles Held
Assemblée Nationale (Chambre des députés) (20 August 1893 – 31 May 1898).

References

French colonial governors and administrators
Governors of French India
People of the French Third Republic
1947 deaths
1852 births